Arwa or Jabal Arwa is a mountain in Asir Region, Saudi Arabia. It stands isolated from neighboring mountain ranges, surrounded by sands, just north of the Mureibekh plain. A few water wells known as Arwa wells are located 2 km to the south east of the mountain.

The mountain was known in ancient times and was frequently mentioned in Arabic poetry of the region.

References

Mountains of Saudi Arabia